Jeronim Mileta (April 17, 1871 in Šibenik – November 23, 1947 in Šibenik) was a Roman Catholic friar who became the bishop of the Diocese of Šibenik in 1922. He served until his death in 1947.

After Mileta's death, the Diocese of Šibenik had no permanent bishop until 1951 due to tensions between the Catholic Church and communist-run Yugoslavia.

See also
Catholic Church in Croatia

References
60th anniversary of the death of Jeronim Mileta

1871 births
1947 deaths
People from the Kingdom of Dalmatia
Bishops of Šibenik
Roman Catholic bishops in Yugoslavia